Sekhukhune II was the paramount King of the Bapedi and grandson of Sekhukhune I. He reigned during the Second Anglo-Boer War.
 Sekhukhune's reign marked the final collapse of the Bapedi resistance against the occupation of their land by the South African Republic and the British Empire.Sekhukhune II his heir Thulare II predeceased him and Kgobalale was appointed as a regent instead of his elder brother Seraki. It was the pedi nation as large that turned down  the appointment of Seraki due to his unruly behaviour. They believed that if Kgobalale should have a problem he could notify his brother Seraki as he was trusted to when it comes to war.

See also 
 Sekwati 
 Mampuru II 
 Sekhukhune I
 Pedi people

References

Sotho-Tswana people
Bapedi monarchy